The 2000 Brisbane Sevens, officially called the 2000 Brisbane International Sevens, was an international rugby sevens tournament that was part of the World Sevens Series in the inaugural 1999–2000 season. It was the Australian Sevens leg of the series, held on 18–19 February 2000, at Lang Park (Suncorp Stadium) in Brisbane.

The tournament was the first edition of the Australian Sevens within the World Sevens Series, and was won by Fiji who defeated Australia 24–21 in the Cup final with a sensational try in the final seconds to Waisale Serevi.

Teams
The participating teams were:

Format
The teams were drawn into four pools of four teams each. Each team played the other teams in their pool once, with 3 points awarded for a win, 2 points for a draw, and 1 point for a loss (no points awarded for a forfeit). The pool stage was played on the first day of the tournament. The top two teams from each pool advanced to the Cup/Plate brackets. The bottom two teams from each pool went on to the Bowl bracket. No Shield trophy was on offer in the 1999-2000 season.

Pool stage

Pool A

Source World Rugby

Source World Rugby

Pool B

Source World Rugby

Source World Rugby

Pool C

Source World Rugby

Source World Rugby

Pool D

Source World Rugby

Knockout stage

Play on the second day of the tournament consisted of finals matches for the Bowl, Plate, and Cup competitions. The following is a list of the recorded results.

Bowl

Source: World Rugby

Plate

Source: World Rugby

Cup

Source: World Rugby

By beating New Zealand in the semifinals, Australia became only the third different nation to reach a World Sevens Series Cup final. Fiji and New Zealand had contested each of the previous six Series Cup finals.

Tournament placings

Source: Rugby7.com

Series standings
At the completion of Round 7:

Source: Rugby7.com

Notes
 South Africa reached the semifinal stage of the Brisbane Sevens but was stripped of all points for the tournament due to fielding ineligible players.

References

External links
 2000 Brisbane 7s video

Australian Sevens
Brisbane Sevens
1999–2000 IRB Sevens World Series